Tays Center is a 1,400-seat indoor arena located in Alamogordo, New Mexico.  It is used primarily for basketball, and is home to the New Mexico State University - Alamogordo basketball team.  It is also used for concerts, conventions, trade shows, graduation ceremonies, and other special events.

As a concert facility the Tays Center can seat up to 2,076.  The arena contains  of floor space and a  permanent stage.  The arena's main lobby contains an additional  of space.  There are two dressing rooms and two locker rooms at the arena; each locker room has 16 lockers.

External links
Tays Center webpage

Indoor arenas in New Mexico
Basketball venues in New Mexico
College basketball venues in the United States
Convention centers in New Mexico
Buildings and structures in Otero County, New Mexico
Tourist attractions in Otero County, New Mexico